Sarinh (also spelled as Sarih) is an old and noted village in the Nakodar tehsil of Jalandhar district in Punjab, India. The marriage party of the fifth Sikh guru, Guru Arjan Dev stayed here for a while on their way back home.

Geography 

Shankar is the nearest railway station (2 km). Tahli and Shekhan Khurd are the surrounding villages.

History 

The village is a part of an event of the Sikh history as the marriage party of the fifth Sikh guru, Guru Arjan Dev, stayed here for a while on their way back home, after  married to Mata Ganga Ji.

See also 
Sarinh, Ludhiana
Buttar Sarinh

References

Villages in Jalandhar district
Villages in Nakodar tehsil